Trifluorotoluene is an organic compound with the formula of C6H5CF3.  This colorless fluorocarbon is used as a specialty solvent in organic synthesis and an intermediate in the production of pesticides and pharmaceuticals.

Synthesis
For small-scale laboratory preparations, trifluorotoluene is synthesized by coupling an aromatic halide and trifluoromethyl iodide in the presence of a copper catalyst:
PhX + CF3I → PhCF3 (where X = I, Br)

Industrial production is done by reacting benzotrichloride with hydrogen fluoride in a pressurized reactor.
PhCCl3 + 3 HF → PhCF3 + 3 HCl

Uses
Trifluorotoluene has a variety of niche uses.

Low toxicity alternative to dichloromethane
According to Ogawa and Curran, trifluorotoluene is similar to dichloromethane in standard acylation, tosylation, and silylation reactions. The dielectric constants for dichloromethane and trifluorotoluene are 9.04 and 9.18, respectively, indicating similar solvating properties. Dipole moments compare less favorably: 1.89 and 2.86 D for dichloromethane and trifluorotoluene, respectively. Replacing dichloromethane is advantageous when conditions require higher boiling solvents, since trifluorotoluene boils at 103 °C it has a higher boiling point than dichloromethane, which has a boiling point of ~40 °C.

As a solvent, trifluorotoluene is useful in mild Lewis-acid catalyzed reactions, such as the Friedel-Crafts preparations.  The most common catalyst, aluminium trichloride reacts with trifluorotoluene at room temperature; however, zinc chloride does not.

Synthetic intermediate
A second and perhaps more valuable use of trifluorotoluene is as a synthetic intermediate.  A derivative of trifluorotoluene, 3-aminobenzotrifluoride, is the precursor to the herbicide fluometuron.  It is synthesized via nitration followed by reduction to meta-H2NC6H4CF3.  This aniline is then converted to the urea. 

Flumetramide (6-[4-(trifluoromethyl)phenyl]morpholin-3-one), a skeletal muscle relaxant, is also prepared from trifluorotoluene.

Analytics
Trifluorotoluene appears in 19F NMR as a singlet at -63.2 ppm.

References

Trifluoromethyl compounds
Phenyl compounds
Halogenated solvents
Aromatic solvents